Morton Mace Denn (born July 7, 1939) is an Albert Einstein Professor of Science and Engineering Emeritus at the City College of New York (CCNY). He is a member of the National Academy of Engineering and a Fellow of the American Academy of Arts and Sciences.

Education 
Denn was born in Paterson, New Jersey. He attended Paterson Eastside High School, from which he graduated in January, 1957. For six months after graduation, prior to attending university, he worked as a laboratory technician for the Linen Thread Company, developing foamed plastic boat bumpers. He received a BScE from Princeton University in 1961, majoring in Chemical Engineering and writing a thesis on the rheology of polymer solutions under the supervision of William R. Schowalter. During the summers of 1960 and 1961 he was employed by the Dupont Company, at the Repauno Works in Gibbstown, New Jersey, and the Engineering Research Laboratory in Wilmington, Delaware, respectively.

Denn attended the University of Minnesota from 1961 to 1964, majoring in Chemical Engineering and minoring in Mathematics. His Ph.D. Dissertation, Optimization by Variational Methods, was supervised by Rutherford Aris. He was a postdoctoral fellow from 1964 to 1965 in the chemical engineering department at the University of Delaware, studying rheology with Arthur B. Metzner.

Career
Denn joined the faculty of the University of Delaware in 1965 as an Assistant Professor, with a joint appointment in the departments of Chemical Engineering, Statistics, and Computer Science. He was named Associate Professor of Chemical Engineering in 1968, Full Professor in 1972, and the Allan P. Colburn Professor in 1978. He moved to the University of California, Berkeley, as Professor of Chemical Engineering in 1981, and he served as the Chemical Engineering Department Chair from 1991 to 1994. He simultaneously held an appointment at the Lawrence Berkeley National Laboratory, where he was the Program Leader for Polymers and Composites in the Center for Advanced Materials (1983–99) and the Head of Materials Chemistry in the Materials Sciences Division (1995–98).

Denn joined the faculty of the City College of New York, the flagship science and engineering campus of the City University of New York, in 1999 as CUNY Distinguished Professor of Chemical Engineering. He was the third Director of the Benjamin Levich Institute for Physicochemical Hydrodynamics and the Albert Einstein Professor of Science and Engineering from 2000, and he also held an appointment as Professor of Physics. He retired in 2014 but continued to participate in research through collaborations.

Denn has held visiting positions at the following institutions: Technion-Israel Institute of Technology, Haifa, Harry Pierce Professor from Sept., 1979 – Jan., 1980; California Institute of Technology, Chevron Energy Professor from February–July, 1980; University of Melbourne, Australia, Visiting Professor from January–June, 1985; Hebrew University of Jerusalem, Israel, Forchheimer Visiting Professor from Sept., 1998 – Jan., 1999, Lady Davis Visiting Professor, 2009-2010; Visiting Professor, Casali Institute of Applied Chemistry, 2021–22;
Katholieke Universiteit Leuven, Erasmus Mundus Scholar, Eurorheo program, May–June, 2011, 2014;
University of Amsterdam, Institute of Physics, Visiting Scholar, one month annually, 2012-2019.

He has served as the Editor of two journals: the AIChE Journal, 1985–91, and the Journal of Rheology, 1995-2005. He also served on the following Editorial Boards: Journal of Non-Newtonian Fluid Mechanics, 1976-2019; Advances in Chemical Engineering, 1984–85,1993-2003; Rheological Acta, 1995-2005; AIChE Journal (Consulting Editor), 1991-95.

Research and publications
Denn's research over the course of his career has focused on optimization; process modeling, dynamics, and control; rheology and flow of complex fluids, including polymers and suspensions; polymer processing; and coal gasification reaction engineering. More than forty of his publications have been cited.

Books
Optimization by Variational Methods, McGraw-Hill, 1969; reprint edition, Robert Krieger, 1978.
Introduction to Chemical Engineering Analysis (with T. W. F. Russell), Wiley, 1972; Spanish language edition, eds. Limusa, 1976.
Stability of Reaction and Transport Processes, Prentice-Hall, 1975.
Process Fluid Mechanics, Prentice-Hall, 1980.
Process Modeling, Longman/Wiley, 1986.
Polymer Melt Processing: Foundations in Fluid Mechanics and Heat Transfer, Cambridge Univ. Press, 2008.
Chemical Engineering: An Introduction, Cambridge Univ. Press, 2012.

Edited Volume 
Chemical Process Control (edited with A. S. Foss), AIChE Symposium Series, No. 159, American Institute of Chemical Engineers, New York, 1976.

Book Chapters 
Modeling for Process Control, in Advances in Control and Dynamic Systems, Vol. XV, C. T. Leondes, ed., Academic Press, 1979, p. 147.
Fibre Spinning, in Computational Analysis of Polymer Processing, J. R. A. Pearson and S. Richardson, eds., Elsevier Applied Science Publ., 1983, p. 179.
Coal Gasification Reactors (with R. Shinnar), in Chemical Reaction and Reactor Engineering, J. J. Carberry and A. Varma, eds., Marcel Dekker, 1986, p. 499.
Processing, Modeling, in Encyclopedia of Polymer Science and Engineering, vol. 13, J. I. Kroschwitz, ed., Wiley, 1988, p. 425; revised version in 3rd Ed., vol. 11, J. I. Kroschwitz, ed., Wiley, 2004, p. 263.
The Identity of our Profession, in C. W. Colton, ed., Perspectives in Chemical Engineering (Advances in Chemical Engineering, 16), Academic Press, NY, 1991, p. 565.

Honors and awards

Denn was a Guggenheim Fellow (1971–72) and a Fulbright Lecturer (1979-80). 
He was elected to the National Academy of Engineering in 1986 and to the American Academy of Arts and Sciences in 2001, and he received an honorary D.Sc. from the University of Minnesota in 2001.
He has received the following awards from professional societies:
American Institute of Chemical Engineers: Professional Progress Award, 1977;, Founders award, and Institute lecturer. 
William H. Walker Award for Excellence in Contributions to Chemical Engineering Literature, 1984; 
Warren K. Lewis Award for Chemical Engineering Education, 1998;
Award winner at the ASEE Chemical Engineering Division, 1993 </ref>, and Institute lecturer
Institute Lecturer, 1999; 
Founders Award for Outstanding Contributions to the Field of Chemical Engineering, 2008.
Society of Rheology: Bingham Medal, 1986; 
Distinguished Service Award, 2005; 
Publication Award (with R. Mari, R. Seto, and J. F.Morris), 2015; 
Publication Award (with A. Singh, R. Mari, and J. F. Morris), 2020.
American Society for Engineering Education: Chemical Engineering Lectureship Award, 2005; 
Lifetime Achievement Award in Chemical Engineering Pedagogy, 2014.

References 

1939 births
Living people
City College of New York faculty
People from Paterson, New Jersey
Members of the United States National Academy of Engineering
Fellows of the American Academy of Arts and Sciences
Princeton University School of Engineering and Applied Science alumni
University of Minnesota College of Science and Engineering alumni
University of Delaware faculty
American chemical engineers
20th-century American engineers
21st-century American engineers
Engineers from New Jersey
Engineers from New York City
UC Berkeley College of Engineering faculty
Lawrence Berkeley National Laboratory people
Members of the American Institute of Chemical Engineers